Cuatzoquitengo Mixtec is a possible Mixtec language of Guerrero.

Ethnologue counts Cuatzoquitengo Mixtec as a dialect of Alacatlatzala Mixtec. However, Egland & Bartholomew found it to have only 55% intelligible with the Cahuatache dialect of Alacatlatzala, the only variety of Mixtec it was compared to.

References 

Mixtec language